Modern pentathlon competitions at the 2023 Pan American Games in Santiago, Chile are scheduled to be held between October 21 and 27, 2023 at the Las Condes Military School.

5 medal events are scheduled to be contested. Two are individual events, one per gender. A further three events (men, women and mixed) in the relay format will be contested.

The top two athletes from North America and South America in individual event, along with the next highest non-qualified athlete will qualify for the 2024 Summer Olympics in Paris, France.

Qualification system

A total of 66 Modern pentathletes will qualify to compete. Each nation may enter a maximum of 6 athletes (three per gender), except for the winners of the individual events at the 2021 Junior Pan American Games. Quotas will be awarded across two qualification tournaments. The host nation, Chile, automatically qualifies four athletes (two per gender). Two quotas (one per gender) will be distributed via the 2021 Junior Pan American Games. The remaining quotas will be awarded per during the 2022 Pan American Championships, with up to three athletes per gender per country.

Medal summary

Medalists

See also
Modern pentathlon at the 2024 Summer Olympics

References

Events at the 2023 Pan American Games
Pan American Games
2023